Coal is one of the largest sources of energy in Russia, accounting for 14.4% of the country's electricity consumption. 
The prominence of coal power in Russia has been declining since 1990, although Russia has among the largest coal reserves in the world. Russia is the fifth largest consumer of coal in the world and is the sixth largest producer of coal.

Coal reserves

Russia has the second largest coal reserves in the world, equaling 19% of the world's total. The total coal reserves in Russia amount to 173 billion tons. This puts Russia behind the United States in total coal reserves, which has 263 billion tons (see coal in the United States). Most of Russia's coal reserves are in the Kuznetsk and Kansk-Achinsk basins.

Coal production

Russia is currently sixth in the world in terms of coal production. It produced 323 million tons of coal in 2009, roughly 4% of the world's total production. As the overall Russian economy shrank in the 1990s following the fall of the Soviet Union and transition to a market economy, coal production decreased as well, falling from a production of 425 million tons in 1988 to 232 million tons in 1998.

Coal production began to rise as the Russian economy rebounded following the 1998 financial crisis, but failed to reach Soviet-era production levels as it peaked at 329 million tons in 2008. Production once again declined with the effects from the 2008 global economic downturn and as world coal prices fell. Coal prices began to recover in 2010 and supported an almost 10 percent rise in Russian production until 2012. The trend continued even as world coal prices fell, as the devaluation of the ruble made Russian coal exports more competitive globally.

The major areas of coal production are the Moscow, Pechora, Kuznetsk, Kansk-Achinsk, Irkutsk and South Yakutsk basins. Over two-thirds of coal produced in Russia is used domestically.

Coal consumption

Russia is self-sufficient in coal, and consumed 223 million tons of coal in 2009. The percentage of coal in Russian power generation has been declining since 1990, when it was 20.7%, due to increasing gas consumption as well as increasing nuclear and hydroelectric energy production. Currently only 14.4% of Russia's power is produced from coal. Coal power plants in Turkey, such as Emba Hunutlu, which burn imported coal prefer Russian because it is cheaper than imports from other countries.

Personal ranks and rank insignia
In 1947, personal ranks were introduced for the personnel of the coal industry and mining construction, as well as uniforms with rank insignia on the collar patches of [tunics, jackets, great coats, and summer blouses. The personal ranks were abolished in 1954, for the coal industry and mining construction, as well as for most other civilian departments and agencies.

See also

Climate change in Russia
Energy policy of Russia
Nuclear power in Russia
Renewable energy in Russia

References